Livin La Vida Loco, a play on the song title "Livin' la Vida Loca" by Ricky Martin, was a concert tour in 1999. It was headlined by Coal Chamber, and organized by the band's record label, Roadrunner Records. Other bands that were featured included Machine Head, Slipknot, Amen and Dope. The tour was formed after Coal Chamber were thrown off a tour with the Insane Clown Posse, and picked up Nadja Peulen as an interim bassist during the tour.

Tour dates

References

External links
 Slipknot tourography

1999 concert tours
Slipknot (band) concert tours